Duczki  is a village in the administrative district of Gmina Wołomin, within Wołomin County, Masovian Voivodeship, in east-central Poland.

The village has an approximate population of 2,500.

References

Duczki